Keith Azopardi  (born 6 June 1967) is a Gibraltarian lawyer and politician serving as Leader of the Opposition and Leader of the Gibraltar Social Democrats since 2017.

He was born in Gibraltar on 6 June 1967 and was called to the Bars of England, Wales and Gibraltar in 1990. He is of Maltese descent.

He was a founder member of the Gibraltar National Party (which later became the Gibraltar Liberal Party) in December 1991. He later contested the 1992 General Election as a candidate for that party, although he was not elected to Parliament.

He served as Minister for Environment & Health for the Gibraltar Social Democrats from 1996 to 2000, after which he was appointed Deputy Chief Minister of Gibraltar and Minister for Trade and Industry, a position he held until 2003. 
 
He stood down from politics in 2003 but later founded the Progressive Democratic Party in June 2006. He was also involved in the negotiations with the British Government that led to the grant of the new Gibraltar Constitution of 2006.

In October 2009, Azopardi published a book "Sovereignty and the Stateless Nation: Gibraltar in the Modern Legal Context" (Hart Publishing ) discussing the constitutional status of Gibraltar, and proposing ways forward to achieve an enduring settlement to the dispute with Spain.

In July 2017, he rejoined with the GSD and has represented himself as candidate for 2017 Gibraltar Social Democrats leadership election, opposing Roy Clinton. He won the elections and became the new leader of the GSD in November 30, 2017

See also
 List of Gibraltarians
 Politics of Gibraltar

References

Living people
20th-century Gibraltarian lawyers
21st-century Gibraltarian lawyers
Progressive Democratic Party (Gibraltar) politicians
Gibraltar Social Democrats politicians
Government ministers of Gibraltar
1967 births
Gibraltarian Queen's Counsel
Gibraltarian people of Maltese descent
British political party founders